Lisselton is a village in County Kerry, Ireland. It is located 8 km northwest of Listowel on the R553 road to Ballybunion. The village is part of the parish of Ballydonoghue, which is located in the north of the county. The village contains three pubs, several shops and there are two primary schools in the parish.

Sport

Sporting organisations in the parish include Ballydonoghue GAA Club and Lisselton Rovers FC. Lisselton Rovers was previously based in Lisselton and played in the Kerry District League. The club relocated to Ballybunion and renamed themselves LB Rovers in 2012.

Ballydonoghue GAA club have their own grounds at Coolard. The club has been represented on the county team on a number of occasions, providing three of the 1947 team that played in the only All Ireland final ever hosted outside of the country, the Kerry-Cavan duel played in the Polo Grounds in New York.

Amenities
The village contains three pubs (Cantillons, Tomáisín's and The Thatch Bar), a church, a supermarket/post office and a butchers. There are about 50 houses in the village itself, and two primary schools in the parish.

Lisselton Grotto was built in 1954, the Marian Year. It was later refurbished as part of the work carried out by members of the local FÁS scheme.

Transport
The Lartigue Monorail passed through Lisselton between 1888 and 1924. The village now has a taxi and bus service.

Education
Lisselton National School opened in 1983. The school has approximately 134 students, five class teachers, a learning support teacher, a resource teacher and two special needs assistants. Coolard National School is the second school. Dromerin National School was the third, but it was closed in September 2012 due to dwindling numbers.

Literature

Lisselton was the birthplace of the novelist Maurice Walsh, whose most famous work was The Quiet Man. John B Keane's family were also from the area and he once remarked that it was a "throbbing vein of literary genius" running through the locality that made it easier to write than not to write.

The Ballydonoghue Parish Magazine was established in the 1980s and each annual edition has articles covering issues of local relevance, including Gaelic games.

See also
 List of towns and villages in Ireland

References

Towns and villages in County Kerry